Hofman is a  Dutch toponymic or occupational surname. In the Netherlands, exactly 10,000 people carried the name in 2007, while in Belgium, 1707 people were named Hofman in 1998. 

Elsewhere, the surname could be derived from the German equivalents Hoffman or Hoffmann. 

Adam Hofman (b. 1980), Polish politician
Anna Hofman-Uddgren (1868–1947), Swedish actress, cabaret singer and film director
Bobby Hofman (1925–1994), American baseball player
Branko Hofman (1929–1991), Slovene poet
Corinne Hofman (b. 1959), Dutch archaeologist
David Hofman (1908–2003), member of the Universal House of Justice
Ethel G. Hofman (b. 1939), Jewish American culinary author
Florentijn Hofman (b. 1977), Dutch artist
 (1758–1835), Flemish poet and playwright
Jan Cornelis Hofman (1889–1966), Dutch art painter
Joanna Hofman (b. 1967), Polish actress, diplomat
Ota Hofman (1928–1989), Czech children's author
Pieter Hofman (1640–1692), Flemish Baroque painter
René Hofman (b. 1961), Dutch footballer
Robin Hofman (b. 1986), Dutch footballer
Rogier Hofman (b. 1986), Dutch field hockey player
 (b. 1981), Dutch handball player
Solly Hofman (1882–1956), American baseball player
Vlastislav Hofman (1884–1964), Czech artist and architect
Wlastimil Hofman (1881–1970), Polish painter
Wim Hofman (b. 1941), Dutch author

See also
Hofmans
Hofmann
Hoffman

References

Dutch-language surnames
Surnames of German origin